Trystan Colon, formerly known as Trystan Colon-Castillo (born March 23, 1998), is an American football center who last played for the Baltimore Ravens of the National Football League (NFL). He played college football at Missouri.

College career
Colon earned the team's Lifter of the Year after his redshirt season. Due to his success as a true freshman, Colon started 13 games the following year, making it onto the SEC coaches' All-Freshman squad. He then started all 25 games for the Tigers in 2018 and 2019 but the team was ineligible to participate in a bowl game due to NCAA sanctions.

Professional career

Baltimore Ravens
After not being selected in the 2020 NFL Draft, Colon was signed as an undrafted free agent by the Baltimore Ravens. He was waived on September 5, 2020, and re-signed to the practice squad the next day. He was elevated to the active roster on October 10, 2020 for the team's week 5 game against the Cincinnati Bengals, and reverted to the practice squad after the game. He was promoted to the active roster on October 12, 2020 and made his first career start against the Pittsburgh Steelers on December 2, 2020 due in part to the Ravens' team-wide COVID-19 outbreak.

The Ravens placed an exclusive-rights free agent tender on Colon on March 10, 2021. He signed the one-year contract on April 18. The Ravens' announcement of this signing officially referred to him as Trystan Colon for the first time, per his request, and has remained the case since.

The Ravens placed an exclusive-rights free agent tender on Colon on March 9, 2022.

References

External links
Baltimore Ravens bio
Missouri Tigers bio

1998 births
Living people
American football centers
Baltimore Ravens players
Missouri Tigers football players
People from Webb City, Missouri
Players of American football from Missouri